Rebel music or Rebel Music may refer to:

Irish rebel music
Rebel Music (Bob Marley and the Wailers album), a 1986 compilation
Rebel Music (Rebel MC album), 1990
Rebel Music, an EP by MC Ren
Rebel Music (SkyBlu album), 2013
Rebel Music (song), a 2014 song by MC Ren